Mylyn Kuve is a senior government official in the Solomon Islands. She held the position of Permanent Secretary in the Ministry of Education until 2011.

References

Women government ministers of the Solomon Islands
Living people
Year of birth missing (living people)
Place of birth missing (living people)